Antônio Diogo (born 20 May 1969) is an Angolan footballer. He played in nine matches for the Angola national football team from 1994 and 1996. He was also named in Angola's squad for the 1996 African Cup of Nations tournament.

References

1969 births
Living people
Angolan footballers
Angola international footballers
1996 African Cup of Nations players
Place of birth missing (living people)
Association football defenders